Gavin Mitchell (born 16 December 1964) is a Scottish actor and comedian, best known for playing Robert "Boaby the Barman" Taylor in the Scottish sitcom Still Game.

Mitchell had a recurring role as Callum McIntyre in the drama series Monarch of the Glen, played various roles in sketch show Velvet Soup, and has appeared in sitcoms Empty, Happy Hollidays and You Instead. He played a recurring character in crime drama The Field of Blood. He appeared in two episodes of series 7 of the children's adventure series M.I. High, in which he also voiced The Mastermind, taking over from Brian Cox.
He can currently be seen playing Grand Duke Sergei Alexandrovich in Netflix's The Last Czars.

On stage, Mitchell has played the male lead in Casablanca: The Gin Joint Cut, a spoof of the Humphrey Bogart film Casablanca, which has appeared at the Edinburgh Fringe. He toured Britain, Paris and Barbados.

Mitchell is a fan of David Bowie: in March 2016 he accepted Bowie's posthumous induction into Glasgow's Barrowland Hall of Fame.

In June 2019, Mitchell won 'Best Actor' at They Scottish Comedy Awards' and in July 2019 was awarded an honorary Doctor of Letters by Glasgow Caledonian University.

References

External links

Gavin Mitchell on BFI

Living people
Scottish male television actors
1966 births
Scottish male comedians
Male actors from Glasgow
Comedians from Glasgow